The Torneo Súper 8 de Básquet (English: Super 8 Basketball Tournament) was a professional basketball national domestic cup competition that took place each year between teams from Argentina's top-tier level basketball league, the Liga Nacional de Básquet (LNB).

Format
The Torneo Súper 8 took place during the middle of the season, usually in the month of December, before the Argentine League's year-end recess. It was an 8 team single-elimination knockout tournament, and was held in one arena. It was held under a format similar to that of the Spanish King's Cup. The winner of the tournament received a place in the FIBA South American League.

History
The Torneo Súper 8 tournament began in 2005, and it was the replacement for the earlier Torneo Top 4 (Top 4 Tournament) cup tournament.

Winners

See also
LNB
Torneo Top 4
Copa Argentina
Torneo InterLigas

External links
Official website 
Pick and Roll (news, info & statistics)  
Argentinian league on Latinabasket.com 
Super 8 Tournament History 
Super 8 Tournament News 

2005 establishments in Argentina
Basketball cup competitions in Argentina
Basketball cup competitions in South America